Rawson Department is a  department of Chubut Province in Argentina.

The provincial subdivision has a population of about 115,829 inhabitants in an area of 3,922 km², and its capital city is Rawson, which is located around 1,404 km from the Capital federal.

Settlements

Playa Unión
Puerto Rawson 
Rawson
Trelew
Playa Magagna
Punta Ninfas
Playa Santa Isabel
Playa El Faro

External links
Rawson website 

Departments of Chubut Province